Norden is a Scandinavian and German word, directly translated as "the North". It may refer to:

Places

England
 Norden, Basingstoke, a ward of Basingstoke and Deane
 Norden, Dorset, a hamlet near Corfe Castle
 Norden, Greater Manchester, a village near Rochdale

Germany
 Norden, Lower Saxony, a town in East Frisia
 Norden (Hambach Forest), a former tree-house colony by environmental activists

United States
 Norden, California, an unincorporated community
 Norden, Nebraska, an unincorporated community
 Norden Township, Minnesota

Businesses
 D/S Norden, a Danish shipping company
 Coop Norden, a joint Scandinavian co-operative retail chain
 Norden Systems, an American electronics manufacturer
 Norden Aquavit, an award-winning traditional, Scandinavian style botanical spirit distilled in Michigan, USA

People

Given name
 Norden Hartman (1921–1989), South African archivist and herald
 Norden E. Huang (born 1937), Taiwanese-American engineer
 Norden Tenzing Bhutia (1950–2019), musician, composer and singer of classic Nepali pop songs

Surname
 Norden (surname), a list of people with the surname Norden

Other uses
 Norden bombsight, used on US bombers during World War II, the Korean War, and the Vietnam War
 Norden Cricket Club, an English cricket club
 Norden Farm Centre for the Arts, an arts centre in Berkshire, England
 Rotary Norden, Nordic magazine for the Nordic countries
 Der Norden, a publication (1935-1944?) of the Nordische Gesellschaft
 Norden, original name of the MV Captayannis, a Greek merchant vessel

See also
 
 Norden railway station (disambiguation)
 Nordic countries, also called Norden